is a Japanese singer and actor who is the main vocalist of the group AAA. He also performs as a solo singer known as Nissy.

Filmography

Television

Film

Discography 

Hocus Pocus (2016)
Hocus Pocus 2 (2017)

References

External links
  
 Official profile 

Japanese male actors
1986 births
Living people
Musicians from Sapporo
AAA (band) members
21st-century Japanese singers
21st-century Japanese male singers